Gold and Company (Gold's) was a department store located in downtown Lincoln, Nebraska. The store was founded in 1915 and quickly grew into one of Lincoln's dominant retailers throughout the 20th century. Gold's merged with the Brandeis department store in 1964 and closed in 1980.

History
Gold and Company was founded by William Gold. The original name was The Peoples' Store until Gold incorporated with his son in 1915, officially naming it Gold and Company. The department store had one location in Lincoln, Nebraska, which was built in 1924. The building grew as the business grew with additions in 1929, 1947, and 1951.

Acquisition by Brandeis
An Omaha-based department store Brandeis merged with Gold's in 1964 to become Brandeis, Gold's Division. Brandeis operated the store for several years until 1980 when the company was shattered also forcing them to sell the downtown Omaha Brandeis flagship shortly after.  The former Gold's building is now Gold's Galleria, a mix of retail stores and offices.

Redevelopment
In early 2023, the city has begun tearing down parts of the historical building as part of a "rehabitability" plan.

See also
 List of defunct department stores of the United States

References

Defunct department stores based in Nebraska
Defunct companies based in Omaha, Nebraska
Retail companies established in 1915
History of Lincoln, Nebraska
Retail companies disestablished in 1987